Classification of wetlands has been a problematical task, with the commonly accepted definition of what constitutes a wetland being among the major difficulties. A number of national wetland classifications exist. In the 1970s, the Ramsar Convention on Wetlands of International Importance introduced a first attempt to establish an internationally acceptable wetland classification scheme.

Ramsar classification

The Ramsar classification of wetland types is intended as a means for fast identification of the main types of wetlands for the purposes of the Convention.

The wetlands are classified into three major classes:

Marine/coastal wetlands
Inland wetlands
Human-made wetlands

These are further subdivided by the type of water: fresh / saline / brackish / alkaline; and may be further classified  by the substrate type of other characteristics.

National systems of classification

Australia
Wetlands in Australia that considered to be of national importance are so classified by criteria published in association with the Directory of Important Wetlands in Australia (DIWA).

The following list is that used within Australia to classify wetland by type:

 A—Marine and Coastal Zone wetlands

 Marine waters—permanent shallow waters less than six metres deep at low tide; includes sea bays, straits
 Subtidal aquatic beds; includes kelp beds, seagrasses, tropical marine meadows
 Coral reefs
 Rocky marine shores; includes rocky offshore islands, sea cliffs
 Sand, shingle or pebble beaches; includes sand bars, spits, sandy islets
 Intertidal mud, sand or salt flats
 Intertidal marshes; includes saltmarshes, salt meadows, saltings, raised salt marshes, tidal brackish and freshwater marshes
 Intertidal forested wetlands; includes mangrove swamps, nipa swamps, tidal freshwater swamp forests
 Brackish to saline lagoons and marshes with one or more relatively narrow connections with the sea
 Freshwater lagoons and marshes in the coastal zone
 Non-tidal freshwater forested wetlands

 B—Inland wetlands

 Permanent rivers and streams; includes waterfalls
 Seasonal and irregular rivers and streams
 Inland deltas (permanent)
 Riverine floodplains; includes river flats, flooded river basins, seasonally flooded grassland, savanna and palm savanna
 Permanent freshwater lakes (> 8 ha); includes large oxbow lakes
 Seasonal/intermittent freshwater lakes (> 8 ha), floodplain lakes
 Permanent saline/brackish lakes
 Seasonal/intermittent saline lakes
 Permanent freshwater ponds (< 8 ha), marshes and swamps on inorganic soils; with emergent vegetation waterlogged for at least most of the growing season
 Seasonal/intermittent freshwater ponds and marshes on inorganic soils; includes sloughs, potholes; seasonally flooded meadows, sedge marshes
 Lakeshore mudflats in freshwater lakes and ponds
 Permanent saline/brackish marshes
 Seasonal saline marshes
 Shrub swamps; shrub-dominated freshwater marsh, shrub carr, alder thicket on inorganic soils
 Freshwater swamp forest; seasonally flooded forest, wooded swamps; on inorganic soils
 Peatlands; forest, shrub or open bogs
 Alpine and tundra wetlands; includes alpine meadows, tundra pools, temporary waters from snow melt
 Freshwater springs, oases and rock pools
 Geothermal wetlands
 Inland, subterranean karst wetlands

 C—Human-made wetlands

 Water storage areas; reservoirs, barrages, hydro-electric dams, impoundments (generally > 8 ha)
 Ponds, including farm ponds, stock ponds, small tanks (generally < 8 ha)
 Aquaculture ponds; fish ponds, shrimp ponds
 Salt exploitation; salt pans, salines
 Excavations; gravel pits, borrow pits, mining pools
 Wastewater treatment; sewage farms, settling ponds, oxidation basins
 Irrigated land and irrigation channels; rice fields, canals, ditches
 Seasonally flooded arable land, farm land

United States
Wetlands of the United States are classified according to the U.S. Fish and Wildlife Service's National Wetlands Inventory (NWI).

In the US, the best known classification systems are the Cowardin classification system and the hydrogeomorphic (HGM) classification system.

See also

Biome classification
Ecological land classification

References

Wetlands